Fiorella Bonicelli and Gail Benedetti were the defending champions but only Fiorella Bonicelli competed that year with Anna-Maria Nasuelli. Fiorella Bonicelli and Anna-Maria Nasuelli lost in first round to Mary Carillo and Diane Evers.

Regina Maršíková and Pam Teeguarden won in the final 5–7, 6–4, 6–2 against Rayni Fox and Helen Gourlay.

Seeds

Draw

Finals

Top half

Bottom half

References

External links
1977 French Open – Women's draws and results at the International Tennis Federation

Women's Doubles
French Open by year – Women's doubles
1977 in women's tennis
1977 in French women's sport